The 2022 Sultan Azlan Shah Cup was the 29th edition of the Sultan Azlan Shah Cup. It was held in Ipoh, Malaysia from 1 until 10 November.

The number of teams for this year's cup is the same as last edition's tournament where six teams competed. Pakistan, Egypt, Japan, Malaysia, South Africa, and South Korea participated in this edition of the Sultan Azlan Shah Cup.

Teams
Including the host nation, 6 teams competed in the tournament.

Results
All times are local, MYT (UTC+8).

Pool

Classification round

Fifth and sixth place

Third and fourth place

Final

Statistics

Final standing

Goalscorers

See also
2022 Sultan of Johor Cup

References

2022
2022 in field hockey
November 2022 sports events in Malaysia
2022 in Malaysian sport